Poltergeist is an American horror film franchise distributed by Metro-Goldwyn-Mayer during the 1980s. The original trilogy revolves around the members of the Freeling family, who are stalked and terrorized by a group of ghosts, led by a demon known as the Beast, that are attracted to the youngest daughter, Carol Anne. The original film was co-written and produced by Steven Spielberg. The Poltergeist films collected a total of approximately $132 million at the United States box office.

Fox 2000 Pictures and Metro-Goldwyn-Mayer released a "revisionist" reboot of the series on May 22, 2015.

Films

Poltergeist (1982) 

Poltergeist is the original film in the trilogy, directed by Tobe Hooper, co-written by Steven Spielberg and released on June 4, 1982. The story focuses on the Freeling family, which consists of parents Steve (Craig T. Nelson) and Diane (JoBeth Williams); teenage daughter Dana (Dominique Dunne); eight-year-old Robbie (Oliver Robins); and five-year-old Carol Anne (Heather O'Rourke), who live in Cuesta Verde, a California housing development which comes to be haunted by ghosts. The apparitions, under the control of a demon known as the "Beast", communicate through the family's television set and can only be heard by Carol Anne. Attracted to her life force and believing she will help lead them into the "Light", the specters abduct Carol Anne through her bedroom closet, which acts as a portal to their dimension. Much of the film involves the family's efforts to rescue their daughter, aided by a group of parapsychologists (Beatrice Straight, Martin Casella, Richard Lawson) and spiritual medium Tangina Barrons (Zelda Rubinstein). Carol Anne is eventually rescued from the other side and, following a second attack by the Beast that reveals the ghosts had originated from an improperly relocated cemetery beneath the neighborhood, the Freelings flee Cuesta Verde just before the house implodes and disappears into another dimension.

Poltergeist II: The Other Side (1986) 

The first sequel, Poltergeist II: The Other Side, directed by Brian Gibson and released on May 23, 1986, takes place one year after the events in Poltergeist and offers an alternate explanation of the ghosts' origin. The film also develops the identity and backstory of the Beast, who lived during the 19th century as a religious zealot named Reverend Henry Kane (Julian Beck). Kane was the leader of a utopian cult, who in anticipation of the end of the world, sealed themselves in a cavern located directly below what later became the Freeling property. Kane is anxious to possess Carol Anne to continue manipulating his followers after death. The ghosts follow and attack the Freelings at their current household. Aided by an American Indian shaman named Taylor (Will Sampson), the Freelings manage to escape from Kane and his followers a second time.

Poltergeist III (1988) 

The final film in the original trilogy, Poltergeist III, directed and co-written by Gary Sherman, was released on June 10, 1988. To protect Carol Anne, the Freelings have sent her to live temporarily in a Chicago skyscraper with skeptical relatives Pat and Bruce Gardner (Nancy Allen and Tom Skerritt) and their daughter Donna (Lara Flynn Boyle). However, during psychiatric sessions, Carol Anne's recollection of her experiences enables Kane and his followers to locate her and make contact through the building's ubiquitous mirrors. The ghosts abduct Carol Anne and then Donna, prompting Pat, Bruce, and Donna's boyfriend Scott (Kipley Wentz) to enlist the help of Tangina, who eventually escorts Kane into the spectral Light, thereby sacrificing herself to save the family.

Poltergeist (2015) 

A reboot of the original film, Poltergeist was directed by Gil Kenan and released on May 22, 2015. It centers on a family struggling to make ends meet who relocate to a suburban home. As in the original, the youngest daughter is kidnapped by spirits that inhabit the house. Sam Rockwell and Rosemarie DeWitt star as the married couple, Kennedi Clements plays the daughter, and Jared Harris plays the host of a paranormal-themed TV show who comes to the aid of the family.

Cancelled sequels and adaptions 
On February 6, 1989, following the release of Poltergeist III on home video, MGM/UA Telecommunications planned to co-finance 90 episodes of "Poltergeist: The Series" at a cost of $60 million with two foreign partners. However, the series would never materialize. In the early 1990s a rumor surrounding a possible Poltergeist IV being written came into fruition. The rumored film would serve as a prequel about the antagonist of Poltergeist II: The Other Side and Poltergeist III in the past, expanding on the story in the second film. 

Sometime around 2000 after Poltergeist: The Legacy ended, MGM Television was rumored to be interested or negotiating to produce a spin-off to the show.

In October 2005, internet rumors surrounding a possible Poltergeist IV began circulating. This was later confirmed as a sequel titled Poltergeist: Kayeri that was being written by Clint Morris which would focus on Steven Freeling from the first two films and disregard the events of Poltergeist III. However after Metro-Goldwyn-Mayer was purchased by Sony Entertainment, the project eventually died.  

In May 2007, more rumors about Metro-Goldwyn-Mayer developing a fourth film began floating around. Another Poltergeist sequel which was being written by Michael Grais the co-writer of the first two films in the series, was tentatively titled Poltergeist: In The Shadows. This sequel also never materialized.

Future 
On April 10, 2019, it was announced that the Russo brothers would helm a new remake of the franchise. In September 2019, after the Russo brothers announced their reboot of the Poltergeist films, they expressed interest in developing the films into a series rather than a film. However Joe Russo stated that the project seemed to be on hold for the time-being.

“That was something that we were talking about, I don’t know that that ultimately came to fruition, but it was something that I loved as a kid… I was interested in turning it into a television series.”

As of 2022, the planned reboot has never materialized.

Television

Poltergeist: The Legacy (1996–1999) 

A spin-off television series, Poltergeist: The Legacy, ran from 1996 to 1999, though it does not have any connection to the films other than the title.

Cast and crew

Cast 
The following table shows the cast members who played the primary characters in the film series.

Crew

Reception

Box office performance

Critical and public response

Poltergeist curse 
The "Poltergeist curse" is a rumored curse attached to the Poltergeist trilogy and its crew, derived from the deaths of two young cast members in the six years between the releases of the first and third films. The rumor and the surrounding deaths were explored in a 2002 episode of E! True Hollywood Story titled "Curse of Poltergeist".
* Dominique Dunne, who played eldest daughter Dana in the first film, died on November 4, 1982, at age 22 after being strangled by her ex-boyfriend John Thomas Sweeney. He was convicted of voluntary manslaughter and sentenced to six years in prison, but was paroled after serving three and a half years. She also appeared in the 1982 movie Shadow Riders.

 Heather O'Rourke, who played Carol Anne in all three Poltergeist films, died on February 1, 1988, at the age of 12 due to complications from an acute bowel obstruction.

Documentary 
The Curse of Poltergeist, a documentary film based on the mystery of the franchise, was set to begin shooting in November 2015, with Adam Ripp as director; financing and production was to be provided by his company Vega Baby, alongside Indonesia-based MD Pictures. The documentary intended to focus on the life and experiences of actor Oliver Robins, who played Robbie Freeling in the first and second installments of the franchise, as a way to explore the tragedies that have befallen those involved with the films. The movie has yet to be produced.

See also 
 List of ghost films

References

External links 
 
 
 
 
 

 
American film series
Film series introduced in 1982
Horror film franchises
Amazon (company) franchises
Metro-Goldwyn-Mayer franchises
Films about curses